Pontorson is a commune in the Manche department in north-western France. On 1 January 2016, the former communes of Macey and Vessey were merged into Pontorson.

Geography
Pontorson is situated about 10 kilometres from the Mont Saint-Michel, to which it is connected by highway and a walking path along the river Couesnon. The river also gives its name to the town's main street.

Climate
Pontorson has a oceanic climate (Köppen climate classification Cfb).

History
The town was founded in the 12th century after a vow by William the Conqueror. It was home to a fortress, which was razed to the ground in 1623 by order of King Louis XIII of France.

During World War II, after the liberation of the area by Allied Forces in 1944, engineers of the Ninth Air Force IX Engineering Command began construction of a combat Advanced Landing Ground outside of the town.  Declared operational on 10 August, the airfield was designated as "A-28", it was used by the 368th Fighter Group which flew P-47 Thunderbolts until early September when the unit moved into Central France.  Afterward, the airfield was closed.

Frantz Fanon practiced psychiatry at Pontorson in the early 1950s.

In 1990, Pontorson twinned with the town of Highworth in England.

Main sights

Notre-Dame church, built between 1050 and 1150, with additions in the 15th century. It is in Romanesque-transition Gothic style; it has a massive appearance with a central portal, flanked by two towers.
Old Protestant Temple (16th century)
Guischard de la Ménardière house (also known as "Roman House", 11th-12th centuries)
Residence of the counts of Montgomery

Transportation 
Pontorson is home to the nearest SNCF railway station to France's second most popular tourist attraction, Mont Saint-Michel.

Despite the town's role as a tourist gateway, train services are relatively rare, about three or four per day.

See also
Communes of the Manche department

References

Communes of Manche